The Ambassador of South Korea to the Philippines is the chief diplomatic representative of the Republic of Korea accredited to the Philippines.

List of representatives

See also
 Foreign relations of the Philippines
 Foreign relations of South Korea
 List of ambassadors of the Philippines to South Korea

References

External links
 English website of the South Korean Embassy, Manila
 Korean website of the South Korean Embassy, Manila

 
Philippines
South Korea